Suman is an Indian actor who works predominantly in Telugu and Tamil. He also featured in few Kannada, Malayalam and Hindi.

Films

References

Indian filmographies
Male actor filmographies